is a passenger railway station in located in the city of Shima,  Mie Prefecture, Japan, operated by the private railway operator Kintetsu Railway.

Lines
Anagawa Station is served by the Shima Line, and is located 59.1 rail kilometers from the terminus of the line at Ise-Nakagawa Station.

Station layout
The station was consists of two elevated opposed side platforms, with the station building underneath. The station is unattended.

Platforms

Adjacent stations

History
Anagawa Station opened on July 23, 1929, as a station on the Shima Electric Railway. The line was one of six private companies consolidated into Mie Kotsu by order of the Japanese government on February 11, 1944. When Mie Kotsu dissolved on February 1, 1964, the station became part of the Mie Electric Railway, which was then acquired by Kintetsu on April 1, 1965. The station was reopened on March 1, 1970. Kintetsu moved the station to the current site on the elevated dual-track section on June 1, 1993.

Passenger statistics
In fiscal 2019, the station was used by an average of 34 passengers daily (boarding passengers only).

Surrounding area
Yuu-Store department store

See also
List of railway stations in Japan

References

External links

Kintetsu: Anagawa Station  

Railway stations in Japan opened in 1929
Railway stations in Mie Prefecture
Stations of Kintetsu Railway
Shima, Mie